Coresi (also known as Deacon Coresi) d. 1583, Brașov was a Romanian printer of the sixteenth century. He was the editor of some of the earliest printed books in the Romanian language.

Biography
Coresi first became active at Târgoviște, but then moved to Brașov, where he started printing books not only in Church Slavonic, but also in Romanian. He first learned the art of printing from Dimitrije Ljubavić, who was himself working for the Metropolitanate of Wallachia.

List of books printed by Coresi

Tetraevanghelul (1561)
Întrebare creștinească (Catehismul) (1561–1562)
Liturghierul (1570)
Psaltirea (1570)

See also
First Romanian School

References
  Petre P. Panaitescu, Începuturile și biruința scrisului în limba română, Bucharest, Editura Academiei, 1965, pp. 133–163.
 
 
  Istoria limbii române literare. Epoca veche (1532–1780) (coordonator Ion Gheție), Bucharest, Editura Academiei Române, 1997.
  Ion Gheție, Al. Mareș, De când se scrie românește?, Bucharest, Editura Univers Enciclopedic, 2001.

1583 deaths
Year of birth unknown
Romanian printers
Romanian typographers and type designers